Anne Henriette of France (14 August 1727 – 10 February 1752) was a French princess, the twin of Louise Élisabeth of France. She was the second child of King Louis XV and his queen consort, Marie Leszczyńska.

Life

Early life

Anne Henriette and her older twin sister Princess Louise Élisabeth were born at the Palace of Versailles on 14 August 1727, to Louis XV of France and Queen Maria Leszczyńska. While the birth of the twins was considered a political disappointment as Salic Law disqualified them as heirs to the throne, their father, the King was delighted, and commented that after talk of him not being able to be a father, he was now the father of two.

Along with her twin, she was baptised at Versailles in 1727. Henriette was named after her paternal great-great grandmother Henrietta, Duchess of Orleans, with Louis Henri, Duke of Bourbon, and Louise Anne de Bourbon as her godparents. As the legitimate daughter of the king, she was a fille de France, but as the younger of the twins, she was referred as Madame Seconde; as an adult, she became known as Madame Henriette, or only Madame, as the eldest daughter of the king present in Versailles after the marriage of her sister.

The eldest children of Louis XV, the twins Élisabeth and Henriette, Marie-Louise, Adélaïde and their brother, the Dauphin of France, were raised in Versailles under the supervision of the Governess of the Children of France, Marie Isabelle de Rohan, duchesse de Tallard, while their younger siblings, Victoire, Sophie, Thérèse and Louise, were sent to be raised at the Abbey of Fontevraud in June 1738.

In 1739, Élisabeth left France to marry the Infante Philip, a younger son of King Philip V of Spain. Henriette was reportedly despondent about being separated from her twin.

Adult life

Royal French children were allowed to participate in court life as well as arrange their own festivities even in childhood; those kept at court participated in court life from the age of twelve. From 1744 onward, Henriette and Adélaïde accompanied their father to the Opera in Paris, and from 1746, they hunted with him five days a week. In 1744, Henriette and Adelaide were officially transferred from the royal nursery and the King created their own household, the Household of the Mesdames aînées ('Elder Mesdames') and appointed two ladies-in-waiting (dame pour accompagner Mesdames); two years later, they were given their own dame d'honneur.

Henriette was considered to be a beauty and prettier than her elder twin. She was described as gentle and melancholic, reserved but intensely loyal, and gifted in music. She was evidently the favorite child of her father, and it was said that she had no enemies at court.

Despite her beauty, no serious marriage negotiations were ever made for Henriette. In 1740, Louis François, Prince of Conti, suggested a marriage between himself and Henriette to her father; when he became alone with the king during a hunt, explaining that he believed that he could make Henriette happy, and that such a marriage would mean that she would never have to leave her father and France; but the king did not react favorably to the proposal.

Henriette reportedly fell mutually in love with her cousin, Louis Philippe, heir to the House of Orléans, and wished to marry him. The King initially approved, but changed his mind, not wanting the House of Orléans too close to the throne. The plans were discontinued in 1743, when the duke married someone else.

Her twin Élisabeth, who was described as ambitious, was not satisfied as the spouse of a prince without a throne; she kept in contact with the French court, and had already by 1740 established a network of contacts there to assist her in her ambitions; Henriette was one of her most fervent champions in this issue; the powerful Noailles and Maurepas allied with the queen to achieve the same, and the French ambassador at Madrid, Monseigneur Vaurdal, Archbishop of Rheims. Otherwise regarded as habitually apathetic about politics, Henriette was reportedly passionately devoted to working for the political ambitions of her twin, as was her younger sister Adélaïde and her sister-in-law Infanta Maria Teresa.

Henriette, as well as her siblings, disliked their father's extramarital liaisons because they caused their father to neglect their mother. Their discontent with their father's adultery was directed toward his mistresses, notably Madame de Pompadour, who from 1745 onward was the influential maîtresse-en-titre. With her brother, the Dauphin Louis, and her sister, Madame Adélaïde, she called the powerful mistress Maman Putain ("Mother Whore"). When Louise Élisabeth returned from Parma for a year-long visit to Versailles in 1748, she and Madame de Pompadour became close friends, which led to a temporary estrangement between the sisters.

In 1747, her brother Louis was forced to marry Maria Josepha of Saxony, shortly after the death of his beloved first spouse, Maria Teresa Rafaela, in childbirth. Louis was initially hostile toward his new wife, even more so when his only child with the Spanish Infanta died, but she eventually managed to win his affection upon advice from Henriette.

Death
Henriette died of smallpox in 1752 at the age of twenty-four. In February of that year, she had felt somewhat unwell and tired, but when the king asked her to accompany him on a sledge ride, she gave no signs of her discomfort, and accepted the invitation anyway. She was badly affected by the chilly weather, and died after just three days of illness. Her family was described as being in a "state of stupefaction over the rapidity of the illness."

Louis XV reacted with "violent" despair upon her death and gave orders for the highest honors around her funeral; in order to enhance  public mourning, her remains were placed at the Tuileries instead of Versailles prior to the funeral, dressed in one of her finest dresses and made up so to appear alive. But the public funeral reception was not to the king's taste, as the people "drank, laughed and amused themselves", which was taken as a sign of the diminishing reputation of the monarchy, as the public interpreted the death of Henriette to be a sign of divine disapproval of the king's lifestyle.

Her heart was interred in the Abbey of Val-de-Grace, while her remains were buried at the Basilica of Saint Denis, along with her sister Élisabeth. Her tomb, like other royal tombs at Saint-Denis, was destroyed during the French Revolution.

Madame Campan later wrote: "Madame Henriette, twin sister of the Duchess of Parma, was much regretted, for she had considerable influence over the King’s mind, and it was remarked that if she had lived she would have been assiduous in finding him amusements in the bosom of his family, would have followed him in his short excursions, and would have done the honours of the 'petits soupers' which he was so fond of giving in his private apartments."

Ancestry

References

Notes
The majority of this article is based on a translation of the equivalent article of the French Wikipedia

Further reading
 Zieliński, Ryszard (1978). Polka na francuskim tronie. Czytelnik.

1727 births
1752 deaths
18th-century French people
18th-century French women
People from Versailles
Deaths from smallpox
Burials at the Basilica of Saint-Denis
French people of Polish descent
Infectious disease deaths in France
Princesses of France (Bourbon)
French twins
Children of Louis XV
Daughters of kings